Roma McLaughlin (born 6 March 1998) is an Irish footballer who plays as a midfielder for Fortuna Hjørring and has appeared for the Republic of Ireland women's national team.

Club career

Youth career
McLaughlin played during her youth career with Greencastle United in Greencastle, County Donegal, until 2015. In 2013, Mclaughlin helped Moville Community College win the National Cup for Schools.

Peamount United
McLaughlin played for Peamount United for two seasons, joining for the 2015–16 season. In 2015, she was selected as the WNL Young Player of the Year. During the shortened 2016 season, McLaughlin played well again, being nominated for the WNL Young Player of the Year award again. In both seasons she was selected for the Team of the Year.

Shelbourne
McLaughlin joined Shelbourne in January 2017. In her first season with the club, she scored 11 goals. She then re-signed with the club ahead of the 2018 season. In July 2018, McLaughlin was nominated for the Continental Tyres Women's National League Player of the Month award.

Fortuna Hjørring
In January 2023 McLaughlin signed an 18-month professional contract with Danish Kvindeligaen club Fortuna Hjørring.

College career
In September 2018, McLaughlin moved to the United States, joining Central Connecticut Blue Devils, the athletics division of Central Connecticut State University in New Britain, Connecticut. In her first season, she scored two goals in 18 games. She was selected twice for the Northeast Conference (NEC) Rookie of the Week and at the end of the season was selected for the 2018 Northeast Conference All-Rookie Team and was awarded the 2018 Northeast Conference Rookie of the Year award. In her second season, she helped the team win the NEC title. She was named as the 2019 NEC Midfielder of the Year. In December 2019, McLaughlin was named to the women's soccer All-America team, making her the first player from the Central Connecticut Blue Devils named to an All-America team.

International career
McLaughlin has been capped for the Republic of Ireland national team. She made her debut in 2016, making two appearances. In 2017, McLaughlin was called up for Republic of Ireland's 2017 Cyprus Women's Cup squad. In the Cyprus Cup, she came on as an 80th minute substitute in the 2–0 victory over Czech Republic. In the second match, a scoreless draw against Hungary, she started the match and played 73 minutes. McLaughlin has also appeared for the team during the 2019 FIFA Women's World Cup qualifying cycle.

McLaughlin also represented Republic of Ireland's under-19 team, playing in the 2017 UEFA Women's Under-19 Championship 1st qualifying round, in which Ireland beat Macedonia, Italy, and Wales. In March 2017, she was awarded the 2016 International Under-19 Woman's Player of the Year award during the Football Association of Ireland's International Football Awards.

Personal life
McLaughlin went to school at Moville Community College.

References

External links
 
 
 

1998 births
Living people
Peamount United F.C. players
Shelbourne F.C. (women) players
Central Connecticut Blue Devils women's soccer players
Republic of Ireland women's association footballers
Republic of Ireland women's international footballers
Women's association football midfielders
Republic of Ireland women's youth international footballers
Women's National League (Ireland) players
Expatriate women's footballers in Denmark
Fortuna Hjørring players
Association footballers from County Donegal
Irish expatriate sportspeople in Denmark
Irish expatriate sportspeople in the United States
Expatriate women's soccer players in the United States
Elitedivisionen players